Murat Alyüz (1920 – 30 May 2006) was a Turkish footballer. He competed in the men's tournament at the 1948 Summer Olympics.

References

External links
 

1920 births
2006 deaths
Turkish footballers
Turkey international footballers
Olympic footballers of Turkey
Footballers at the 1948 Summer Olympics
Footballers from Istanbul
Association football defenders